Hacelia attenuata is a species of sea star. The type species of the genus Hacelia, it was  described by John Edward Gray in 1840. It is found in the Mediterranean Sea.

External links
 

Ophidiasteridae
Taxa named by John Edward Gray